Captain Jinks of the Horse Marines is a lost 1916 silent film directed by Fred E. Wright and starring Ann Murdock. It is based on the 1901 play of the same name by Clyde Fitch which starred Ethel Barrymore. It was produced by the Essanay Studios in Chicago.

Cast
Richard Travers as Robert Carrolton Jinks
Ann Murdock as Aurelia, Madame Trentoni
John Junior as Gussie von Volkenburg
Edmund Cobb as Charlie La Martine
Camille D'Arcy as Mrs. Greenborough
Laura Frankenfield as Mrs. Jinks
Ernest Maupain as Professor Balliarti
Bruce Kent as Pete, the bellboy
Charles J. Stine as Band Leader

References

External links

1916 films
Essanay Studios films
Films directed by Fred E. Wright
American silent feature films
American black-and-white films
Lost American films
American films based on plays
1910s English-language films
1916 comedy-drama films
1916 lost films
Lost comedy-drama films
1910s American films
Silent American comedy-drama films